A. Joseph DeNucci (August 30, 1939 – September 8, 2017) was a middleweight boxer and the Auditor of the Commonwealth of Massachusetts.

Early life and career
DeNucci started working at 10 in a bowling alley, picking up and racking pins. DeNucci started boxing at 16, winning the New England Golden Gloves Championship.

A boxer in the 1950s, 1960s and 1970s, DeNucci compiled a record of 54 wins (with 27 knockouts), 15 losses, and 4 draws. He lost two middleweight championship fights to Emile Griffith. DeNucci holds the record for the most fights, 23, in the Boston Garden.

Political career
DeNucci served in the Massachusetts House of Representatives for ten years, where he was chairman of the Human Services Committee. DeNucci then served as the Auditor of the Commonwealth of Massachusetts from 1987 to 2011.  DeNucci was the longest-serving Auditor in Massachusetts history. He decided not to seek re-election in 2010.

Personal life
DeNucci had five children and fourteen grandchildren, and was married to Barbara DeNucci. He was a member of the National Italian American Sports Hall of Fame.

DeNucci died on September 8, 2017, from complications related to Alzheimer's disease. Postmortem analysis of DeNucci's brain confirmed that he experienced chronic traumatic encephalopathy (CTE).

References

|-

1939 births
2017 deaths
Politicians from Newton, Massachusetts
American people of Italian descent
Boston University alumni
Democratic Party members of the Massachusetts House of Representatives
State auditors of Massachusetts
American male boxers
Boxers from Massachusetts
Deaths from Alzheimer's disease
Neurological disease deaths in Massachusetts
Middleweight boxers
Sportspeople with chronic traumatic encephalopathy